Monkey Banana Kitchen is an album by English rock band Family Fodder, released in 1980 by record label Fresh Records.

Critical reception 

Trouser Press wrote: "Remarkable and great fun, it's a record that will keep you on the edge of your seat."

Legacy 
Monkey Banana Kitchen was included on The Wire's list "100 Records That Set the World on Fire (While No One Was Listening)".

Track listing

References

External links 
 

1980 albums
Family Fodder albums